Bentley is a hamlet in the East Riding of Yorkshire, England. Bentley forms part of the civil parish of Rowley.

Access to the hamlet from the main road is by agricultural vehicles only.

References

External links
 
 

Hamlets in the East Riding of Yorkshire